This is a year-by-year and all-time list of top scorers in the Copa Libertadores football tournament. Alberto Spencer is the all-time top goalscorer of the Copa Libertadores with 54 goals, while Daniel Onega is the record top goalscorer in a single season, with 17 goals in 1966.

The data below does not include the 1948 South American Championship of Champions, as it is not listed by CONMEBOL either as a Copa Libertadores edition or as an official competition. It must be pointed out, however, that at least in the years 1996 and 1997, CONMEBOL entitled equal status to both the Copa Libertadores and the 1948 tournament, in that the 1948 champions (Vasco da Gama) were allowed to participate in the Supercopa Libertadores, a CONMEBOL official competition that allowed participation for former Libertadores champions only (for example, not admitting participation for champions of other CONMEBOL official competitions, such as the Copa CONMEBOL).

By tournament

By player
Players in italic currently still play professional football.

See also
 History of the Copa Libertadores
 Records and statistics of the Copa Libertadores

External links
Copa Libertadores Topscorers at RSSSF
CONMEBOL Website: Libertadores Topscorers

Records and statistics
Copa Libertadores
Copa Libertadores